Pedr James is a British television director. His career in the industry began in the 1970s, and in the 1980s he worked on highly rated series such as the Channel 4 soap opera Brookside. In the 1990s he moved into directing more prestigious drama serials, such as the 1994 BBC adaptation of the Charles Dickens novel Martin Chuzzlewit. He was also one of the directors of the BBC's award-winning drama serial Our Friends in the North in 1996. Subsequently, he left directing to become the Head of Drama at BBC Wales, a position he filled from 1997 to 2000.

External links

BBC executives
British television directors
Living people
Year of birth missing (living people)